Khomutovka is an urban locality (an urban-type settlement) and the administrative center of Khomutovsky District of Kursk Oblast, Russia. Population:  Telephone code: +7 47137; postal code: 307540.

It was first mentioned in the 18th century and was granted urban-type settlement status in 1967.

References

Urban-type settlements in Kursk Oblast